Holywell Street may refer to:
Holywell Street, London
Holywell Street, Oxford